Dobromierz  is a village-sized municipality in Świdnica County, Lower Silesian Voivodeship, in south-western Poland. It has a population of 800.

It is the main municipality and the seat of the administrative district (gmina) called Gmina Dobromierz. 
 

First mentioned as Vrideberch in a 1307 deed, it received town privileges about 1409. The area was the site of Frederick the Great's victory at the Battle of Hohenfriedberg (Hohenfriedeberg), fought between Austria and Prussia on June 4, 1745 during the War of the Austrian Succession.

Prior to 1945 it was in Germany.

It is the birthplace of Polish cyclist and Olympic medallist Stanisław Szozda.

References

Villages in Świdnica County
Former populated places in Lower Silesian Voivodeship